Dekese Airport  is an airport serving the community of Dekese in Kasaï Province, Democratic Republic of the Congo.

See also

 Transport in the Democratic Republic of the Congo
 List of airports in the Democratic Republic of the Congo

References

External links
 OpenStreetMap - Dekese Airport
 OurAirports - Dekese Airport
 FallingRain - Dekese Airport
 HERE Maps - Dekese Airport
 

Airports in Kasaï Province